The El Salvador national football team season 2010 was the 89th season of the El Salvador national football team, their 72nd season in FIFA and 48th season in CONCACAF. The team was managed by José Luis Rugamas from January 2010. Rubén Israel took over as manager in April 2011. 

The following are fixtures and results in 2010.  Stats are up to date as of October 12, 2010.

Record

Statistics

Goal scorers

Goal Assists

Bookings

Match results

Friendly matches

References

External links
 El Salvador: Fixtures and Results

2010
El
2009–10 in Salvadoran football 
2010–11 in Salvadoran football